The 2005 season is the 83rd season of competitive football in Ecuador.

National leagues

Serie A

Champion: 
Apertura: LDU Quito (8th title)
Clausura: El Nacional (12th title)
International cup qualifiers:
2006 Copa Libertadores: LDU Quito, El Nacional, Deportivo Cuenca
2005 Copa Sudamericana: LDU Quito, El Nacional
Relegated: Deportivo Quevedo (after Apertura); LDU Loja (after Clausura)

Serie B
Winner: 
Apertura: ESPOLI (2nd title)
Clausura: Macará (3rd title)
Promoted: ESPOLI (after Apertura); Macará (after Clausura)
Relegated: Tungurahua, Santa Rita

Segunda
Winner: Deportivo Azogues
Promoted: Deportivo Azogues, Imbabura

Clubs in international competitions

National teams

Senior team
The Ecuador national team played seventeen matches in 2005: their remaining seven 2006 FIFA World Cup qualifiers, and ten friendlies.

2006 FIFA World Cup qualifiers

Ecuador finished their 2006 FIFA World Cup qualifying campaign in 3rd place, behind Brazil and Argentina. This marked their second qualification to the tournament.

Friendlies

References

External links
 National leagues details on RSSSF
 National teams details on RSSSF

 
2005